Gwaihiria is a genus of wasps belonging to the family Diapriidae.

Species:

Gwaihiria allocerata 
Gwaihiria bifoveata

References

Diapriidae
Hymenoptera genera
Organisms named after Tolkien and his works